= Dramatic Structure: The Shaping of Experience =

1973 nonfiction book by Jackson B. Barry

- Author: Jackson G. Barry
- Genre: Nonfiction
- Published: 1973
- Publisher: University of California Press

Dramatic Structure: The Shaping of Experience is a nonfiction book written by Jackson G. Barry and published in 1973 by the University of California Press.
